Box Hill railway station may refer to:

Box Hill railway station, Melbourne, Australia
Box Hill railway station, Wellington, New Zealand
Box Hill & Westhumble railway station, Surrey, England